Gluphothrips is a genus of thrips in the family Phlaeothripidae.

Species
 Gluphothrips varicolor

References

Phlaeothripidae
Thrips
Thrips genera